This is a list of the vice-admirals of Munster, a province in the south of Ireland.

Prior to 1585 the whole of Ireland was served by a single vice-admiral, namely Thomas Radcliffe, 3rd Earl of Sussex (1558–1565), Gerald Fitzgerald, 11th Earl of Kildare (1564–1573) and Thomas Butler, 10th Earl of Ormonde (1585). Separate vice-admiralties were then established for Munster in 1585, for Ulster by 1602, for Leinster by 1612 and for Connaught by 1615.

Vice-admirals of Munster
Source (1585–1561):

Source (1661–):

 1585 John Norris
 1585–1598 no appointment known
 1598 Henry Cowper
 1599 George Warham
 1599–1606 no appointment known
 1606 Thomas Smith
 1607 Humphrey Jobson
 1607–1610 no appointment known
 1610–1613 William Howard, Lord Howard of Effingham
 1613  Sir John Ferne
 1613–1624 no appointment known
 1624–1633 Henry Cary, 1st Viscount Falkland
 1634–1641 Thomas Wentworth, 1st Viscount Wentworth
 1641 Robert Sydney, 2nd Earl of Leicester
 1641–1645 no appointment known
 1645–1648 Roger Boyle, 1st Baron Broghill
 1648–1660 no appointment known
 1660–1670 Sir William Penn
 1670–1677 Robert Southwell
 1691–1701 Sir Robert Southwell
 1701–1730 Edward Southwell Sr.
 1733–1755 Edward Southwell Jr.
 1755–1758 Brabazon Ponsonby, 1st Earl of Bessborough
 1758–1793 William Ponsonby, 2nd Earl of Bessborough
 1822–1826 Henry Beresford, 2nd Marquess of Waterford
 1838–1856 William Hare, 2nd Earl of Listowel

References

Military ranks of the United Kingdom
Vice-Admirals
Munster